Linda Norman may refer to:
 Linda Norman (nurse), American nurse and academic administrator
 Linda Norman (politician), member of the Maryland Senate